"Come Closer" is a song by Nigerian singer Wizkid featuring Canadian rapper Drake. The song was released as the third single from the former's third studio album, Sounds from the Other Side (2017). In September 2020, Wizkid became the first African artist to be certified Gold (both) as a featured and lead artist in the United States, as the song sold 500,000 units.

Background
Wizkid revealed the song was recorded in early 2016 at the same time as he and Drake's other collaborative single, "One Dance" (2016), which peaked at number one on the US Billboard Hot 100 as well as the UK Singles Chart and the Canadian Hot 100. The song was released as the third single from Wizkid's third studio album, Sounds from the Other Side, and was the album's most commercially successful track. The song marked Wizkid's third official collaboration with Drake.

Commercial performance
The single peaked at number 58 on the UK Singles Chart, becoming Wizkid's first charting single as a lead artist, and the best-performing African record of 2017 at large. The single peaked at number 54 on the Canadian Hot 100.  In August and November 2017, the song was certified Gold and Silver by Music Canada and the BPI respectively, making it his most commercially successful international single till date. In 2021, Wizkid extended his record as the first Nigerian, Platinum-certified artist in Canada, with Come Closer's second certification in the country. It is one of the most successful songs by an Afrobeats artist.

Accolades

In November the same year, the song was awarded AFRIMA 2017 Song of the Year. 2baba & DJ Jimmy Jatt handed over the trophy to Wizkid. On the night, the Nigerian took two of the most important awards—Artist of the Year and Song of the Year—along with the Best Male West Africa award.

Charts

Certifications

References

2017 songs
2017 singles
Wizkid songs
Drake (musician) songs
Songs written by Wizkid
Songs written by Drake (musician)
Song recordings produced by Sarz
Electronic dance music songs
Reggae fusion songs